Amphidromus noriokowasoei is a species of medium-sized air-breathing tree snail, an arboreal gastropod mollusk in the family Camaenidae.

Distribution 
Lâm Đồng Province and Đăk Nông Province, Vietnam.

Habitat 
On trees.

Etymology 
This species is named after Mr. Norio Kowasoei from Japan, brother-in-law of Franz Huber, who provided the type material.

References

noriokowasoei
Gastropods described in 2017